Beach handball was one of the invitational sports at the 2001 World Games in Akita and was played between 23 and 25 August.  Athletes from 9 nations participated in the tournament. The competition took place at Honjō Marina in Honjō.

Participating nations

Medal table

Events

References

External links
 International Handball Federation
 Beach handball on IWGA website
 Results

 
2001 World Games
2001
Yurihonjō